Frank Henter (born 30 January 1964) is a former freestyle swimmer from West Germany.

Frank competed in the 50 metres freestyle at the 1988 Summer Olympics in Seoul, South Korea, finishing seventh in the Championship Final in a time of 23.03 seconds. His preliminary time was slightly quicker at 22.98 seconds.

References

German male swimmers
Olympic swimmers of West Germany
Swimmers at the 1988 Summer Olympics
1964 births
Living people